Pine Brook, sometimes spelled Pinebrook, is a census-designated place and unincorporated community located within Montville in Morris County, in the U.S. state of New Jersey. As of the 2020 United States census, the CDP had a population of 5,675.

The area is served as United States Postal Service ZIP Code 07058.

History

Native American settlement 

Over 10,000 years ago, the area now known as Pine Brook was settled by Lenape tribes as part of the Lenapehoking. The Lenape tribes maintained peace and no significant battles were recorded in the area today known as Montville Township.

Dutch and English settlement 
In the 1710s, Dutch farmers from New Amsterdam settled in Pine Brook. A farming community, Pine Brook produced dairy products in addition to fruits and vegetables, and for many years there existed a large business in cider making and distilling of cider brandy in nearby Cider Mills. 

In 1760, Pine Brook was the site of the first schoolhouse in Montville Township. It was built out of logs and was located on the road leading to Boonton, according to A History of Morris County, which could refer to multiple northwest-facing roads including Changebridge Road. 

With its close proximity to Morristown during the American Revolutionary War, both British and American forces traveled through the area.

American history 
Additional Pine Brook schools were constructed in 1785, 1816, and 1852.

In 1809, the Parsippany and Roadway Turnpike Company constructed the road that begins at Pine Brook that "ran up through the Boudinot Meadows, Troy, Parsippany, Denville, Rockaway, across the mountain to Mount Pleasant, there joining the Union Turnpike." This possibly refers to the western terminus of today's "Bloomfield Avenue" where it becomes U.S. Route 46, connecting the port city of Newark with the farms, foundries, and mines of West New Jersey.

On April 11, 1867, the New Jersey Legislature formally united and chartered the three sections of White Hall, Montville, and Pine Brook into present day Montville Township from territory set off from Pequannock Township.

WAY STATION  - "From the description of property in old deeds, it appears that between 1800 and 1810 an attempt was made to name the cluster of three or four houses at Pine Brook, where George D. Mead keeps a store, "Union Village", but as a village failed to grow up, the name was dropped and has been forgotten. At this point, a tavern was kept over eighty years and for many years it did a legitimate and profitable business in the accommodations of "Sussex Teams", as they were called, which in large numbers used to pass this way toward Newark with loads of flour, feed, grain, butter, pork, and other produce from Sussex, Warren, and the upper parts of Morris county."  (Hon. John Kanouse - 1881)

The Pine Brook Speedway, which operated from July 1962 until October 1989, was designed for midget car racing and became one of the earliest sites for microstock racing. Mario Andretti raced at the track and had some of his earliest success as a race car driver at the speedway.

Geography
Pine Brook is located at the southern end of the Hook Mountain Range and surrounded by the Pine Brook Flats; a fertile flood plain created by the surrounding Rockaway River and Passaic River. It is bounded to its north by Montville and Towaco, also known as White Hall, to its east by the Passaic River across from Fairfield (Old Horse Neck) and West Caldwell, to its south by the Rockaway River across from East Hanover Township, and to its west by the Rockaway River across from Parsippany and Lake Hiawatha.

Demographics
As of the 2010 United States Census, the population for ZIP Code Tabulation Area 07058 was 5,372.

Notable residents

People who were born in, residents of, or otherwise closely associated with Pine Brook include:
 Alan Sepinwall (born 1973), television reviewer and writer.
 Travis Warech (born 1991), basketball player for Hapoel Tel Aviv B.C. of the Israeli Premier League

References

External links

Montville, New Jersey
Unincorporated communities in Morris County, New Jersey
Unincorporated communities in New Jersey